The 1921–22 Connecticut Aggies men's basketball team represented Connecticut Agricultural College, now the University of Connecticut, in the 1921–22 collegiate men's basketball season. The Aggies completed the season with a 15–4 overall record. The Aggies were members of the Athletic League of New England State Colleges, where they ended the season with a 6–1 record. The Aggies played their home games at Hawley Armory in Storrs, Connecticut, and were led by first-year head coach J. Wilder Tasker.

Schedule 

|-
!colspan=12 style=""| Regular Season

Schedule Source:

References 

UConn Huskies men's basketball seasons
Connecticut
1921 in sports in Connecticut
1922 in sports in Connecticut